Dirk Demeersman (born 15 July 1964) is a Belgian equestrian who competes in the sport of show jumping.

At the 2012 Summer Olympics in London, he was a member of the Belgian team with Bufero VH Panishof, in the team jumping competition which finished in thirteenth place.

Record

Olympic Games 
2004 Athens: Equal 4th place with Clinton

World Championships 
 2010 Kentucky, (USA) with Bufero VH Panishof: Team Bronze

References

External links

1964 births
Living people
Equestrians at the 1992 Summer Olympics
Equestrians at the 2004 Summer Olympics
Equestrians at the 2012 Summer Olympics
Belgian show jumping riders
Olympic equestrians of Belgium
Belgian male equestrians
People from Sint-Truiden
Sportspeople from Limburg (Belgium)